Gérard Albert Mourou (born 22 June 1944) is a French scientist and pioneer in the field of electrical engineering and lasers.  He was awarded a Nobel Prize in Physics in 2018, along with Donna Strickland, for the invention of chirped pulse amplification, a technique later used to create ultrashort-pulse, very high-intensity (petawatt) laser pulses.

In 1994, Mourou and his team at the University of Michigan discovered that the balance between the self-focusing refraction (see Kerr effect) and self-attenuating diffraction by ionization and rarefaction of a laser beam of terawatt intensities in the atmosphere creates "filaments" that act as waveguides for the beam, thus preventing divergence.

Career
Mourou has been director of the Laboratoire d'optique appliquée at the ENSTA from 2005 to 2009. He is a professor and member of Haut Collège at the École polytechnique and A. D. Moore Distinguished University Professor Emeritus at the University of Michigan where he has taught for over 16 years. He was the founding director of the Center for Ultrafast Optical Science at the University of Michigan in 1990. He had previously led a research group on ultrafast sciences at Laboratoire d'optique appliquée of ENSTA and École polytechnique, after obtaining a PhD degree from Pierre and Marie Curie University in 1973. He then went to the United States and became a professor at the University of Rochester in 1977, where he and his then student Donna Strickland produced their Nobel prize-winning work in the Laboratory for Laser Energetics at the university. The pair co-invented chirped pulse amplification, a "method of generating high-intensity, ultra-short optical pulses". Strickland's doctoral thesis was on "development of an ultra-bright laser and an application to multi-photon ionization".

In the 2000s, Mourou was featured by a French film company in a publicity video for the Extreme Light Infrastructure (ELI).

Nobel Prize 

On 2 October 2018, Mourou and Strickland were awarded the Nobel Prize in Physics, for their joint work on chirped pulse amplification. They shared half of the Prize, while the other half was awarded to Arthur Ashkin for his invention of "optical tweezers that grab particles, atoms, viruses and other living cells with their laser beam fingers".

Mourou and Strickland found that stretching a laser out reduced its peak power, which could then be greatly amplified using normal instruments.
It could then be compressed to create the short-lived, highly powerful lasers they were after. The technique, which was described in Strickland's first scientific publication, came to be known as chirped pulse amplification (CPA). They were probably unaware at the time that their tools would make it possible to study natural phenomena in unprecedented ways. CPA could also per definition be used to create a laser pulse that only lasts one attosecond, one-billionth of a billionth of a second. At those timescales, it became possible not only to study chemical reactions, but what happens inside individual atoms.

The Guardian and Scientific American provided simplified summaries of the work of Strickland and Mourou: it "paved the way for the shortest, most intense laser beams ever created". "The ultrabrief, ultrasharp beams can be used to make extremely precise cuts so their technique is now used in laser machining and enables doctors to perform millions of corrective" laser eye surgeries. Canadian Prime Minister Justin Trudeau acknowledged the achievements of Mourou and Strickland: "Their innovative work can be found in applications including corrective eye surgery, and is expected to have a significant impact on cancer therapy and other physics research in the future".

Awards and honors
1995 – R. W. Wood Prize by the OSA
1997 – SPIE Harold E. Edgerton Award
2002 – National Academy of Engineering Member
2004 – IEEE LEOS Quantum Electronics Award
2005 – Willis E. Lamb Award for Laser Science and Quantum Optics
2009 – Charles Hard Townes Award by the OSA
 2016 – Frederic Ives Medal
2018 – Arthur L. Schawlow Prize in Laser Science by the American Physical Society
2018 – Nobel Prize in Physics, together with Arthur Ashkin and Donna Strickland
 2020 – Honorary Doctorate of Vilnius University
 25 February 2020 – Honorary Doctorate of Bulgarian Academy of Sciences, ceremony

Writings

References

External links

Laboratoire d'Optique Appliquee 
Ecole Polytechnique, Palaiseau
Center for Ultrafast Optical Science
  including the Nobel Lecture on 8 December 2018 Passion for Extreme Light: for the greatest benefit to human kind

1944 births
Living people
Academic staff of École Polytechnique
Fellow Members of the IEEE
Fellows of Optica (society)
Fellows of the American Physical Society
Foreign Members of the Russian Academy of Sciences
French Nobel laureates
French physicists
Laser researchers
Members of the United States National Academy of Engineering
Nobel laureates in Physics
Officiers of the Légion d'honneur
People from Ardèche
Pierre and Marie Curie University alumni
University of Michigan faculty